Timurlengia is an extinct genus of tyrannosauroid theropod dinosaur found in Uzbekistan, in the Bissekty Formation in the Kyzylkum Desert, hailing from the Turonian age of the early Late Cretaceous. The type species is Timurlengia euotica.

Discovery
From 1944 onwards, tyrannosauroid fossil material consisting of single bones has been described from the Bissekty Formation by Soviet or Russian researchers. In 2004 a team discovered a braincase, which would have anchored the dinosaur's neck muscles and protected its brain and ear canals. The braincase was stored in a cardboard box in the Zoological Institute of the Russian Academy of Sciences, until tyrannosaur expert Steve Brusatte identified it as a distinctive new species in 2014.

In 2016, Stephen Louis Brusatte, Alexander Averianov, Hans-Dieter Sues, Amy Muir, and Ian B. Butler named and described the type species Timurlengia euotica. The genus is named after Timurleng, founder of the Timurid Empire in Central Asia. The specific name euotica is Greek for “well-eared”, because detailed CAT-scans showed that Timurlengia had long inner ear canals, for  hearing low-frequency sounds.

The species was based on the holotype, specimen ZIN PH 1146/16, consisting of the braincase. Other bones, not belonging to a single individual, and described in 2012, were referred to the species. These included the specimens ZIN PH 854/16: the right half of a braincase; ZIN PH 676/16: a right maxilla; ZIN PH 2330/16: a left frontal bone; ZIN PH 2296/16: a left quadrate; ZIN PH 15/16: a piece of a right dentary; ZIN PH 1239/16: a right articular with angular; ZIN PH 671/16: a front neck vertebra; USNM 538131: a rear neck vertebra; USNM 538132: the neural arch of front back vertebra; CCMGE 432/12457: a middle back vertebra; ZIN PH 951/16: a front tail vertebra; ZIN PH 120/16: a middle tail vertebra; ZIN PH 120/16: a rear tail vertebra; ZINPH 619/16; and USNM 538167: a toe claw. These fossils were referred under the assumption that but a single tyrannosauroid taxon is present in the Bissekty Formation.

Description

ZIN PH 1239/16 represents a larger, adult individual.

In 2016, several distinguishing traits were established, all pertaining to the holotype braincase. The supraoccipital bone, the central upper bone of the rear of the skull, has a diamond-shaped process pointing to below and not reaching the upper rim of the foramen magnum. The basioccipital has extremely short basal tubers, only attaining a third of the height of the occipital condyle. The oval window and the ear vestibule form a funnel-shaped recess penetrating deep into the ear zone and having a wide exit on the side wall of the braincase. The inner ear is large with robust semicircular canals.

Phylogeny
Timurlengia was placed in the Tyrannosauroidea, in a basal position, as a possible sister species of Xiongguanlong. Together they may represent a clade of long-snouted forms that might have been the sister group of the Tyrannosauridae.

The genus is important in showing how earlier small tyrannosauroids evolved into the large Tyrannosauridae like Tyrannosaurus, typical of the Late Cretaceous period of Asia and North America. The species is not believed to be a direct ancestor of Tyrannosaurus. Timurlengia lived ninety million years ago, in the middle-late Turonian age of the early Late Cretaceous, right before the rise of the advanced tyrannosaurids. There had been a twenty million year "tyrannosaur gap" in the fossil records of the tyrannosauroid timeline, between the small "marginal hunters" and the "apex predators" of the tyrannosaurid group. The discovery of Timurlengia has filled that gap. Timurlengia reveals that tyrannosaurs had yet to achieve huge size at this time but had already evolved key brain and sensory features of the gigantic latest Cretaceous species. These features were originally thought to be unique to big tyrannosaurs, as they evolved into large animals. Tyrannosaurs apparently developed huge size rapidly during the late Cretaceous, and their success in the top predator role may have been enabled by their brain and keen senses which first evolved at a smaller body size. Timurlengia'''s small size indicates that tyrannosaurs only evolved their large size in the last twenty million years of their evolution. It is unknown what precisely triggered the size increase.

The braincase of Timurlengia shows that tyrannosaurs likely developed their advanced head first, as hypothesised by Hans-Dieter Sues, one of the fossil's describers. Timurlengia’s skull, though much smaller than that of Tyrannosaurus, shows a sophisticated brain that would have led to keen eyesight, smell and hearing.  At the time tyrannosaurs were developing acute senses and cognitive abilities, other large meat-eating dinosaurs such as the  Carnosauria were disappearing from the environment or dying out, creating a vacant niche, allowing tyrannosaurs to become apex predators. The head of Timurlengia is far less pneumatised than that of the larger tyrannosaurids; the increased airspaces with the later forms might have been an adaptation to lighten the skull or to keep a good hearing ability despite the larger size.

Classification
Below is the phylogenetic analysis on the placement of Timurlengia.

PaleobiologyTimurlengia was likely a pursuit hunter with blade-like teeth for slicing through meat, based on its skeletal remains. The robustness of the semicircular inner ear canals might be related to a greater agility. Timurlengia'' has a long cochlear duct, with the same height as the labyrinth, an adaptation to hearing low-frequency sounds. This might be an indication that the animal used low calls to communicate within the species.

See also
 Timeline of tyrannosaur research
2016 in paleontology

References

Tyrannosaurs
Turonian life
Late Cretaceous dinosaurs of Asia
Fossils of Uzbekistan
Bissekty Formation
Fossil taxa described in 2016
Taxa named by Stephen L. Brusatte
Taxa named by Hans-Dieter Sues
†